Qaisarbagh (Hindi: क़ैसरबाग़, Urdu: , , Emperor's Garden), also spelled Qaiserbagh, Kaisarbagh or Kaiserbagh, is a complex in the city of Lucknow, located in the Awadh region of India. It was built by Wajid Ali Shah (1847-1856), the last Nawab of Awadh. The campaigning Irish journalist William Howard Russell wrote a classic account of the looting of the Qaisar Bagh in 1858 by drunken British troops in the course of the Great Uprising/Indian Mutiny. A kiosk from the Qaisar Bagh gardens was sent to England as a tribute for Queen Victoria and now stands in the Frogmore Gardens at Windsor Castle.

See also
Architecture of Lucknow
Meena Baazar

References

External links

Columbia University: Pictures of Qaisarbagh

Buildings and structures in Lucknow
Gardens in Lucknow
Indian Rebellion of 1857
Persian gardens in India
Paradise gardens in India